Patrick James Aikman Tice (born 30 June 1994 in Basingstoke, Hampshire) is a    first-class cricketer who plays for Cambridge University Cricket Club. Tice was part of the Ireland national under-19 cricket team in the 2012 Under-19 Cricket World Cup in Australia as wicket-keeper-batsman. He made his first-class debut against Oxford University Cricket Club at FP Fenner's Ground, Cambridge where he scored seven runs and stumped Richard O'Grady off Avish Patel. He is the brother of Irish women's cricketer Elena Tice. He now currently works at The Fulham Boys School.

Fulham Boys School Biography 
PATRICK TICE – RE TEACHER

Patrick moved to London with his wife in the summer of 2020. He had previously spent two years teaching a range of subjects at St. Columba's College in Dublin, having moved out of Management Consultancy with Accenture and into teaching. He is halfway through a Professional Masters in Education from University College Dublin (he will complete his second year remotely with The Fulham Boys School). He has a BA in Theology and Philosophy of Religion and a masters in New Testament Studies - both from Cambridge University (Fitzwilliam College).

Outside of the classroom, Patrick is a committed Christian and passionate about youth work and his local church - Hope Church Vauxhall. He is a keen sportsman. He was captain of Cambridge University Cricket Club in 2018, leading the team to a 2-1 Varsity Series win. He also represented Ireland in the Junior World Cup in Australia 2012 and played professionally for Leinster Lightning in 2019. Equally, he enjoys football, rugby and golf but, having grown up in a farming community, is most happy when pursuing his country pursuits - especially with fly-rod in hand.

"But seek first his kingdom and his righteousness, and all these things will be given to you as well."

References

External links
 
 

1994 births
Living people
Cambridge MCCU cricketers
Cambridge University cricketers
Cricketers from Basingstoke
Irish cricketers
Leinster Lightning cricketers
Wicket-keepers
Alumni of Fitzwilliam College, Cambridge